Silent Strength is the first solo studio album by American singer Shirley Jones of The Partridge Family music group. The album features 11 tracks of contemporary christian music songs. The track "You'll Never Walk Alone" is an updated cover version of the song Shirley Jones originally recorded for the film Carousel.  Silent Strength was recorded in Nashville, Tennessee. It was produced by George King and arranged by David T. Clydesdale who also co-produced. Silent Strength was released in 1989 and issued on Diadem Records. It was available on compact disc and on cassette tape but not on vinyl.

Track listing

"Here I Am" - 2:59 
"Declare the Glory of Our King" - 3:11 
"Silent Strength" - 5:29
"I May Never Pass This Way Again"- 2:59
"All Around the World" - 3:56 
"We Come to Worship You" - 5:45
"A Simple Song of Praise" -  2:27
"God Will Provide the Lamb" - 5:09 
"You'll Never Walk Alone" - 5:08 
"Just Gotta Tell You" - 3:38 
"Welcome Home Children" - 4:00

References

Shirley Jones albums
1989 debut albums